Christian Silfver (born August 19, 1991) is a Finnish ice hockey defenceman. He is currently playing with SønderjyskE Ishockey in the Danish Metal Ligaen.

Silfver made his SM-liiga debut playing with HIFK during the 2011–12 SM-liiga season.

References

External links

1991 births
Living people
Finnish ice hockey defencemen
HIFK (ice hockey) players
Lahti Pelicans players
Ice hockey people from Helsinki